The Middle Head Fortifications is a heritage-listed former defence establishment and military fortifications and now public space located at Middle Head Road, Middle Head,  in the Mosman Council local government area of New South Wales, Australia. It is also known as the Middle Head Military Fortifications or The Old Fort. The fortifications consist of the Outer Middle Head Battery located at the end of Old Fort Road, the Inner Middle Head Battery located at the end of Governors Road, and the Obelisk batteries reached by a path from the corner of Middle Head Road and Chowder Bay Road. The fortifications at Middle Head formed part of Sydney Harbour's defences. The property is owned by the NSW Office of Environment and Heritage. It was added to the New South Wales State Heritage Register on 2 April 1999.

History

The first fort at Middle Head was built in 1801 and the last batteries were constructed in 1942. The majority of the fortifications were built between 1870 and 1911. The site contains the works of several periods and technologies, which remain in place for review today. Historically it dates from the time when defence was first moved away from Sydney Cove and towards The Heads.

There were three sets of fortifications built in Mosman and Middle Head in the 1870s, these were upgraded in the 1880s on the advice of British experts. These fortifications still exist and are now heritage listed, they are, the Lower Georges Heights Commanding Position, the Georges Head Battery and a smaller fort located on Bradleys Head, known as the Bradleys Head Fortification Complex.

The battery on Middle Head built in 1871 was designed by James Barnet, a colonial architect. The fort was built on a strategic location and received many additions until 1911. It formed part of a network of 'outer harbour' defences. They were designed to fire at enemy ships as they attempted entry through the Sydney Heads. The whole area is linked by an extensive network of tunnels, ancillary rooms, gunpowder magazine and a disappearing gun emplacement. The site has its own underground power room that is supported by iron columns. Rooms located below ground were used to train some of Australia's first troops who were sent to Vietnam in 'Code of Conduct' courses, which were lessons in how to withstand torture and interrogation, by simulating prisoner of war conditions.

In 1974 the Middle Head fortifications featured in the movie Stone.

In 1979 most of the area became national park and the military has moved on to more strategic locations. The army base on site which included the transport group and 30 Terminal Squadron, left Georges Height's in 1997. The Headquarters Training Command section relocated to the Victoria Barracks in 2002.

The Officers Quarters
The Officers quarters is a Victorian Regency style building that was built on a rough stone base. It was designed by Colonial Architect James Barnet and is considered to be one of the most significant buildings at Middle Head. The site incorporates a defensive ditch or moat and includes a fortification wall. The house looking in the direction of Middle Harbour meant that it could be used for surveillance purposes as well.

One former resident was Major General Sir William Throsby Bridges , the first commander of the First Australian Imperial Force and the commander of Australian forces in the Gallipoli Campaign. Throsby Bridges was killed by a sniper whilst leading the forces at Gallipoli. His warhorse Sandy was brought back to Australia, seeing out its days in Victoria.

Primarily used as a residence this building originally housed two officers separately, a senior and junior officer. During World War II this building served as a Red Cross Hospital and later as accommodation for the Australian Women's Army Service. The house continues to be used as a residence.

Restoration
Extensive restoration work has been conducted by the Sydney Harbour Federation Trust which has revived many of the old buildings.

The sites facilities include:
Former military hospital buildings
Former Officers' mess
Former barracks converted to the School of Pacific Administration
Former 10 Terminal Transport Depot, later the Army School of Intelligence
30 Terminal Transport Depot
Former Submarine Miners' Depot, later Army Maritime School
Wharf, jetty
Training facilities
Fortifications systems
Depots, barracks, mess halls
Residential accommodation
Ovals

Heritage listing 
Middle Head Military Fortifications was listed on the New South Wales State Heritage Register on 2 April 1999 and in 2004 the  Barracks Group, including the Georges Head Battery, was inscribed on the Commonwealth Heritage List.

Gallery

See also

Bradleys Head Fortification Complex
Georges Head Battery
Protected areas of New South Wales
 Military history of Australia

References

Bibliography

Attribution

External links

www.harbourtrust.gov.au Middle Head history.
www.ozatwar.com / Australia @ war.
Australian Bunker & Military Museum.
 http://members.tripod.com/~coastalgunner/index.html

Former Barracks in Australia
Batteries in Australia
Bunkers in Oceania
Forts in New South Wales
History of Sydney
James Barnet buildings in Sydney
Mosman Council
New South Wales State Heritage Register
Former military installations in New South Wales
Squares in Australia
Articles incorporating text from the New South Wales State Heritage Register
1801 establishments in Australia
Military installations established in 1801
Military installations closed in 1997
New South Wales places listed on the defunct Register of the National Estate
Sydney Harbour National Park
Commonwealth Heritage List places in New South Wales